.art may refer to:
ART image file format
.art (top-level domain)